"Old Man from the Mountain" is a song written and recorded by American country music artist Merle Haggard and The Strangers.  It was released in June 1974 as the second single from the album Merle Haggard Presents His 30th Album.  It was Haggard and The Strangers eighteenth number one on the country singles chart.  The single went to number one for a single week and spent a total of ten weeks on the chart.

Chart performance

References
 

1974 singles
Merle Haggard songs
Songs written by Merle Haggard
Capitol Records singles
1974 songs